The Boston Astros was an American soccer club based in Boston, Massachusetts, that was a member of the American Soccer League. Initially playing under the name Fall River Astros, the team folded before being restarted under the new Boston Astros name.

The team played its home games at Nickerson Field during 1974 and 1975. At the end of the 1975 season, the team moved to Worcester, Massachusetts. John Bertos was the owner, general manager and head coach of the Boston Astros.

The official website for the Boston Astros is www.bostonastros.com

Year-by-year

As the Fall River Astros

As the Boston Astros

References

A
Defunct soccer clubs in Massachusetts
American Soccer League (1933–1983) teams
Soccer clubs in Massachusetts
1975 disestablishments in Massachusetts
1969 establishments in Massachusetts
Association football clubs established in 1969
Association football clubs disestablished in 1975
1968 disestablishments in Massachusetts
Association football clubs disestablished in 1968